The Water Resources Department is the government department in the state of Madhya Pradesh responsible for irrigation and flood control.

References

External links
 

Government of Madhya Pradesh
Irrigation ministries
Irrigation in India